Asia Racing Team (ART Motorsports) is a Chinese / Macanese motor racing team that was formed in 2003. Its main operational headquarters is located within the Zhuhai International Circuit complex, in Southern China, with a second workshop in Chaoqing's Guangdong International Circuit.

The organization business operation includes a competitive Asian series racing team, the organization of a racing school, corporate track days and promotional events.

The racing team has competed in a number of high-profile championships including Asian Formula Renault/AFR Series, Formula Asia 2.0, Formula Pilota China Series, Formula BMW Pacific, Porsche Carrera Cup Asia, Malaysian Super Series and GT Asia Series, and more recently TCR Asia Series.

Team Management

Philippe Descombes (Team Manager)
The overall operation of the company is managed by motor racing multi-titlist Frenchman, Philippe Descombes. He, who is fluent in Mandarin, was the man to help the launch single seaters careers of several successful Asian drivers, including Cheng Congfu, Ma Qinghua, Rodolfo Ávila, Mathias Beche, Alexandre Imperatori, Jazeman Jaafar, or Rio Haryanto.

Yannick Mazier (Chief Mechanic)
Frenchman Yannick Mazier is with ART since the first day and leads a 12-man mechanics in the workshop based at Zhuhai International Circuit.

History

The Asia Racing Team, Ltd. (ART Motorsports) is a company registered in China and in Macau with assets amounting to more than RMB 10 million. Its main operational headquarters is located within the Zhuhai International Circuit complex, in southern China.

Team Highlights:

2003: A group of successful Macau entrepreneurs creates ART to compete in Asian Formula Renault Challenge – the first race of the team was the 50th Macau Grand Prix.

2004: First full season of racing in Asian Formula Renault, finishing 2nd (Rodolfo Ávila).

2005: ART wins Asian Formula Renault Macau Grand Prix (Hiroyuki Matsumura).

2006: ART conquers Asian Formula Renault's Teams title for the first time and finishes 2nd (Alexandre Imperatori).

2007: ART finished 2nd (Alexandre Imperatori) again in Asian Formula Renault Challenge.

2008: The team was 2nd (Mathias Beche) in Formula Asia 2.0 and wins Asian Drivers Trophy (Rio Haryanto). ART returns to Macau Grand Prix, making the first appearance in Formula BMW Pacific.

2009: The team entered a new era, giving the first steps into GT racing, participating in Porsche Carrera Cup Asia with two overall victories and best rookie (Rodolfo Ávila). ART took AFR Championship Teams title and drivers’ classification first runner up (Luis Sa Silva). Contested the Formula BMW Pacific Macau Grand Prix and Singapore Grand Prix rounds.

2010: Asia Racing Team clinched the AFR Series’ team championship while Sandy Stuvik clinched the Driver points championship, followed by his teammate Tin Sritrai, and the “Asian Drivers Category”.

2011: The team run for the first time two Porsche GT3 Cup-R in GT Asia Series and was in competition for the drivers' championship until the last round at Macau. At the same time the red and black squad embarked in another Porsche Carrera Cup Asia season with a line up of three drivers. The year was also marked by the withdrawn of the team from AFR Series at full-time to primarily focus in Formula Pilota China. Asia Racing Team's Luis Sa Silva was vice-champion.

2012: China's Li Zhi Cong is promoted to ART's GT Asia Series squad and manages to be GT Asia Series vice-champion and AAMC GT Challenge Trophy winner at first try. Thomas Chow has sweated to secure the second place in AFR Series - IFC Class.

2013: Li Zhi Cong seals GT Asia Series championship title and repeats AAMC GT Challenge Trophy win. Leo Wong wins AFR Series IFC Class Trophy.

2014: The team repeats the full season participation in Porsche Carrera Cup Asia and AFR Series, winning the first edition of the 2-hour “Circuit Hero – Formula Enduro” and the four rounds of GT series BOSS GP (Li Chao).

2015: The team joins the newly founded TCR Asia Series, conquering the Teams’ Championship and Drivers’ Vice-championship (Rodolfo Avila) and second runner up (Philippe Descombes). At same time the team keeps collecting race wins in AFR Series and FIA Chinese F4, where Liu Kai finished third overall.

Racing School

The Racing School is the only formal driver training course recognized by both the Hong Kong Automobile Association (HKAA) and the Associação Geral Automóvel Macau-China (AAMC). The organization of a monthly course continues to be popular among the young and elder alike from students to corporate decision-makers.

In 2008 the Racing School introduced the "One-Day Intensive Course", which were designed for racecar beginners and hobbyists, making it possible for both younger and older generations.

In 2016 a low-cost "4-lap Driving Experience" was introduced giving the opportunity to those willing to drive a real single seater racecar at the Zhuhai International Circuit.

ART Motorsports Racing School also owns the only 2-seater single seater in Southeast Asia for promotional activities and racing experiences.

Formula Pilota China

In 2011 Asia Racing Team turned their heads from AFR Series to the newly established single seater championship in the region - the "Formula Pilota China Series" - with an impressive four car line up: China's Chi Cong Li and Naomi Zhang Ran, raced alongside Angola's Luis Sá Silva and Thailand's Tin Sritrai. Sá Silva was vice-champion but the team highlight was the podium swap in Race 1 at Ordos. In 2012 Guangzhou native rookie driver Zou Si Rui was team's only racer in the championship, claiming two podium finishes at Guangzhou International Circuit.

Team Drivers

D.C - Driver Classification,

Asian Formula Renault
Throughout its history the team primarily competed in Asian Formula Renault Challenge, with past drivers including F1 Championship drivers such as Kamui Kobayashi or Kazuki Nakajima. After several tries, and five vice-champions, including Macau's Rodolfo Avila, Switzerland's Alexandre Imperatori, Mathias Beche and Angola's Luís Sá Silva, Thailand's Sandy Stuvik won the championship for Asia Racing Team in 2010.

In 2011, 2012 and 2013 Asia Racing Team confined its participation to the races in Zhuhai.

In 2015 AFR Series introduced the Formula Renault 2.0/13, and Asia Racing Team assisted Canada's Maxx Ebenal on his way to a double win at the inaugural races at Zhuhai Circuit. In the end of the year the team's best classified driver overall was Indonesia's Darma Hutomo. Teammate James Runacres secured the Class B vice-championship title.

Team Drivers

D.C - Driver Classification,
T.C - Team Classification,
† - Only one race (Macau Grand Prix)

Formula BMW Asia Pacific

Asia Racing Team's involvement in Formula BMW Pacific was never at full-time. After taking part in Macau Grand Prix 2008, the team would repeat the single event appearances in Singapore and Macau in the following year. In 2010 Asia Racing Team embarked in a half season adventure with Singaporean driver Suriya Bala and decided to enter Toyota Racing Academy drivers Yuichi Nakayama and Ryo Hirakawa in Okayama and Macau rounds. In Japan Nakayama earned the first and only Pole-Position and podium position for the team.
 
Due to the commitments with the Formula Pilota China in 2011, Asia Racing Team decided to pull out of the series.

Team Drivers

† - Only one race (Macau Grand Prix)

†† - Only one race (Singapore Grand Prix)

††† - Only two races (Japan & Macau)

Porsche Carrera Cup

The team, which has participated in Porsche Carrera Cup Asia in 2009 winning two races, has been keeping an eye on Porsche Carrera Cup Asia in 2010. Following discussions with various drivers, the team has decided to re-enter in the most prestigious series of Southeast Asia as a technical service provider for car owners. Bringing with them a strong racing background as well as a surplus of enthusiasm and excitement, Holland's Marcel Tjia and Hong Kong's Dr Chi Min Ma joined up with Macanese driver Keith Vong to round out the three-car effort. In 2012 Asia Racing Team entered in the series a five-car lineup. Beijing Porsche dealership Betterlife driver Wang Jian Wei third place at Ordos was the team's best result of the season. China's Huang Chu Han won “Class B” races at Sepang and Shanghai.

Team Drivers

D.C - Driver Classification

GT Asia

Asia Racing Team expanded to GT series in 2011. The Macau born and Zhuhai based team entered a couple of Porsche 997 GT3 Cup R in the GT3 class of the GT Asia series for the Hong Kong racers Eddie Yau and Sasha Chu. Yau won in Fuji and was a title contender until the last race of the season at Macau where he got involved in a massive crash without injuries for the driver. In 2012 the team returned to the series with a Porsche 911 GT3 R for the young Chinese racer Li Zhi Cong (aka Chi Cong Li). Although Li Zhi Cong was racing GT cars for the first time, he fought for the championship title until the final race and ended the season in second place, winning three races, including GT Asia Series last round at Macau's Circuito da Guia. Hong Kong racer Sasha Chu took part of Fuji and Autopolis events. Li Zhi Cong returned in 2013, taking the championship by storm by winning GT Asia Series season finale at Macau.

Team Drivers

D.C - Driver Classification, T.C - Team Classification

TCR Asia Series

Asia Racing Team won the inaugural TCR Asia Series teams’ title and capped a winning year with a triple win at the opening round at Sepang and double victory at the season-ending Macau Grand Prix Guia Race.

In nine rounds of series competition, Asia Racing Team's SEAT Léon TCR drivers scored an impressive eleven podium results - including three overall wins for Rodolfo Avila, two for one-time race-returnee Philippe Descombes and one for Thai touring car star Tin Sritrai.

Avila finished second in championship standings and Descombes was third.

Team Drivers

FIA Chinese F4

Asia Racing Team entered in the opening season of the five round FIA Formula 4 China Championship. Beijing's Liu Kai went to the podium for six times, rounding out his campaign with a much deserved race win in the last race of the year at Zhuhai.

Asia Racing Team entered a second car for two occasions: in the first event at Beijing for Hua Miao and in the season finale at Zhuhai for the 15-year old Guangzhou native Charles Lin.

Team Drivers

Timeline

External links 
 Asia Racing Team - Official website
 Zhuhai International Circuit - Official website
 Carrera Cup Asia - Official website

References 

Chinese auto racing teams
Macau auto racing teams
2003 establishments in China
Auto racing teams established in 2003
Motorsport in Macau
Formula Renault teams
Formula BMW teams
Racing schools
TCR Asia Series teams
TCR International Series teams